Sulanga Gini Aran (Dark in the White Light) is a 2015 Sri Lankan Sinhala psychodrama film directed and produced by Vimukthi Jayasundara. It stars Kaushalya Fernando and Mahendra Perera in lead roles along with Ruvin De Silva and Steve De La Zilwa. Music composed by Lakshman Joseph De Saram. Though it premiered internationally in 2015, the film released in Sri Lanka in 2017. It is the 1271st Sri Lankan film in the Sinhala cinema.

The film has received mostly positive reviews from critics.

International recognition
It was screened in many international film festivals such as Festival del film Locarno, and Dubai International Film Festival.

 Locarno International Film Festival 2015 - Nominated Golden Leopard
TOKYO FILMeX 2015 - Jury Special Mention
Festival des 3 Continents 2015 - Competition 
International Film Festival of Asian-Pacific countries in Vladivostok - Competition

Plot
A Buddhist monk on a spiritual quest. A Student trying to test his limits. An organ dealer growing his business. A surgeon who heals by day and rapes women at night. The film interweaves various stories, on the threshold of pain, between life and death.

Cast
 Steve De La Zilwa as Surgeon
 Ruvin De Silva as Monk
 Kaushalya Fernando
 Mahendra Perera as Human organ trafficker
 Suranga Ranawaka
 Bandula Vithanage
 Roshan Ravindra
 Sulochana Weerasinghe 
 Thilakshini Rathnayake
 Samila Vidanage

Awards
 16th Tokyo FILMeX International Film Festival - Jury Special Mention

References

2015 films
2010s Sinhala-language films
2010s psychological drama films
Sri Lankan drama films
Films directed by Vimukthi Jayasundara
2015 drama films